Farmana is one of the villages in Sonipat District of Haryana, India. The nearest town is Kharkhoda.

References 

Villages in Sonipat district